DCF  may refer to:

Medical 
 Data clarification form in clinical trials
 Dénomination Commune Française, a formal French generic name for a drug

Organizations 
 Child protective services, called Department of Children and Families in some U.S. states
 Connecticut Department of Children and Families
 Florida Department of Children and Families
 Vermont Department for Children and Families
 Wisconsin Department of Children and Families
 DCF Advertising, an American advertising agency
 Delaware Community Foundation, a charitable organization
 Dominion Car and Foundry, a former Canadian railcar maker
 Donors Capital Fund, a Virginia-based donor advised charity

Science 
 Dichlorofluorescein, a fluorescent dye
 L-dopachrome isomerase, also called dopachrome conversion factor

Technology 
 DCF77, time signal radio station in Germany.
 Design rule for Camera File system, file system specification for digital cameras
 Device Configuration File, an element of the CANopen communication protocol 
 Distributed coordination function, WLAN technique
 Double-clad fiber
 Document Composition Facility, IBM software

Other uses 
 Canefield Airport, Roseau, Dominica (IATA airport code)
 Dallas Christmas Festival
 Discounted cash flow, in financial analysis
 Direct Consular Filing, process related to immigration, US
 Dorothy Canfield Fisher Children's Book Award, Vermont, US
 Dyneema Composite Fabric, a high-performance non-woven composite material used in high-strength, low-weight applications.
 Supervised injection site, also called drug consumption facility
 The theory of differentially closed fields